Gunner Wright is an American film actor known for his role in the film Love and for portraying Isaac Clarke in the Dead Space video game series. Wright raced motorcycles competitively until the age of 21 when he moved to Southern California. There, he began working on Fox Television's Fastlane series and soon began a career in acting. He appeared in Clint Eastwood's film J. Edgar.

Career 
Wright appeared in G.I. Joe: The Rise of Cobra as a Secret Service Agent. In 2011, Wright starred in the 2011 film Love by director William Eubank. Wright played the main character, American astronaut Lee Miller who becomes stranded aboard the International Space Station.

Wright also stars in Dead Space 2 and Dead Space 3 as protagonist Isaac Clarke, developed by Visceral Games and distributed by Electronic Arts. Wright attended the 2010 Comic-Con to promote Dead Space 2 and meet with fans. 

Variety described Wright's performance in Love, saying "Wright, shouldering nearly a one-man-show burden, is gamely athletic, all-American and somewhat of a blank slate, like Kubrick's astronauts – until some unfettered personality begins to seep out." Ain't It Cool News also described Wright's performance of Captain Lee Miller:

Gunner Wright carries a large load as the primary screen presence, and he does an excellent job of showing the deterioration of a logical man. Many films turn the loss of one's senses into a frantic, almost comically silly thing – whereas here, we watch [him] bounce between skirting the edge of sanity, and reeling himself in – he's self-aware enough at times to see where things are going. You'd get the sense that most astronauts would handle a situation like this in a similar way.

In August 2021, Wright confirmed that he would be reprising his role as Isaac Clarke in the Dead Space remake.

Filmography

Video games

References

External links 
 
 
 

Living people
21st-century American male actors
American male film actors
American male television actors
Year of birth missing (living people)